Girls Do Not Joke (Italian: Ragazze non scherzate) is a 1929 Italian silent comedy film directed by Alfred Lind and starring Leda Gloria, Maurizio D'Ancora and Giuseppe Pierozzi.

Cast
 Isa Bluette
 Maurizio D'Ancora
 Leda Gloria
 Piero Pastore
 Giuseppe Pierozzi

References

Bibliography 
 Riccardo Redi. Cinema muto italiano: 1896-1930. Fondazione Scuola nazionale di cinema, 1999.

External links 
 

1929 films
1929 comedy films
Italian comedy films
Italian silent feature films
1920s Italian-language films
Films directed by Alfred Lind
Italian black-and-white films
Silent comedy films
1920s Italian films